A chief heat officer, or CHO, is a municipal public servant focused on combating the dangers of extreme heat and reducing urban heat island effects.

Most chief heat officers are hired by cities, counties, and other forms of local government. The position emerged in the early 2020s, with several cities in hot climates appointing chief heat officers to try to mitigate the increasing effects of climate change by increasing shade, providing for cooling centers, planting trees, and coordinating anti-heat work. Early heat officer positions were created in Los Angeles, Miami-Dade County, Melbourne, Athens, and Freetown. The initiative to create the positions was organized by the Atlantic Council's Adrienne Arsht-Rockefeller Foundation Resilience Center.

References 

Government occupations
Local government
Climate change mitigation
Local government officers